Lasionycta montanoides is a moth of the family Noctuidae. It is found in China.

Lasionycta
Moths described in 1989